France Bleu Saint-Étienne Loire, sometimes referred to as France Bleu Saint-Étienne, is a generalist radio station broadcasting from Saint-Étienne. It is the youngest of the France Bleu stations, beginning broadcasting on September 9, 2013. The local headquarters are in Saint-Étienne in the Manufacture Plaine Achille, near the studios of France 3.

The station is also broadcast in the Loire department, a large part of the Haute-Loire as well as a small part of that of Rhône on FM: it covers the agglomerations of Saint-Étienne, Roanne, Montbrison and Le Puy-en-Velay.

History 
The name of the station was announced on April 5, 2013. 

Soft launching without an announcement, it began broadcasting on September 9, 2013, as the 44th outpost of the network. Its creation was criticized by the union of Radio France employees as "a detriment to the other stations in the network".

References 

Radio stations in France
Radio stations established in 2013
2013 establishments in France
Radio France